Bassalia Sakanoko (born 3 June 1985) is an Ivorian footballer, who plays as a forward for Excelsior Bever in the Belgian Provincial Leagues.

Club career
Born in Abidjan, Sakanoko played street football and futsal, until he joined semi-professional Ivorian team FC Bibo before going to Belgium for his first stint at WS Woluwe, where he made 17 appearances, scoring one goal. He spent the following year at K.V. Oostende after being signed, and sent straight out on loan by Gent, scoring five goals in 29 appearances.

Peruwelz
On 18 January 2007, Sakanoko signed for Peruwelz for a fee of €70,000. He became a first team regular for the rest of the season, after scoring a hat-trick in his first game including a 25-yard curling effort in the 90th minute to make Peruwelz win against Belgian Pro League  leaders Anderlecht 3–2 in the cup.

Mouscron
In September 2008, he moved to Mouscron for an inflated fee of €500,000, earning himself a reputation for being able to beat players on the turn and hold the ball up with his speed and strength.

Oud-Heverlee Leuven
On 5 August 2009, Sakanoko made a much anticipated yet controversial move to rivals R.E. Mouscron for fee of €2 million with additional fees if he makes a number of appearances and a 20% sell on fee. This was the first club where he started to play a wider role, usually playing on the left wing, making 31 league appearances, twelve assists and four goal.

Return to WS Woluwe
He returned to WS Woluwe in 2010 for an undisclosed fee. He was sent directly out on loan to Lokomotiv Plovdiv, where he was a first team regular. In 2011, he joined third league club Géants Athois.

References

External links

1985 births
Ivorian footballers
Living people
R.S.C. Anderlecht players
RWS Bruxelles players
K.A.A. Gent players
K.V. Oostende players
R.R.C. Peruwelz players
R.E. Mouscron players
Oud-Heverlee Leuven players
PFC Lokomotiv Plovdiv players
Belgian Pro League players
Challenger Pro League players
First Professional Football League (Bulgaria) players
Ivorian expatriate footballers
Expatriate footballers in Belgium
Expatriate footballers in Bulgaria
Footballers from Abidjan
Association football forwards